Sloanea woollsii, commonly known as yellow carabeen, is a large tree species with plank buttresses that is native to northeastern NSW and eastern Queensland, Australia. Its southern distributional limit is near the town of Bulahdelah (32° S) at Tallowwood Forest Park and O'Sullivans Gap Reserve.

Sloanea woollsii is one of the common tree species in subtropical rainforests of Australia growing up to 55 metres tall. It is a typical long-lived (up to 800 years), slow growing and shade tolerant climax species.

References

woollsii
Flora of New South Wales
Flora of Queensland
Oxalidales of Australia
Trees of Australia
Taxa named by Ferdinand von Mueller